The Siyavash sniper rifle is a light rifle designed for and deployed by the Iranian Army.  It carries a 5-round magazine and weighs 14 pounds (6.5 kg).

References

Sniper rifles of Iran
Bolt-action rifles
Bolt-action rifles of Iran